The Yamaha YM2151, also known as OPM (FM Operator Type-M) is an eight-channel, four-operator sound chip. It was Yamaha's first single-chip FM synthesis implementation, being created originally for some of the Yamaha DX series of keyboards (DX21, DX27, and DX100). Yamaha also used it in some of their budget-priced electric pianos, such as the YPR-7, -8, and -9.

Uses
The YM2151 was used in many arcade game system boards, starting with Atari's Marble Madness in 1984, then Sega arcade system boards from 1985, and then arcade games from Konami, Capcom, Data East, and Namco, as well as Williams pinball machines, with its heaviest use in the mid-to-late 1980s. It was also used in Sharp's X1 and X68000 home computers. 

The chip was used in the Yamaha SFG-01 and SFG-05 FM Sound Synthesizer units. These are expansion units for Yamaha MSX computers and were already built into some machines such as the Yamaha CX5M. Later SFG-05 modules contain the YM2164 (OPP), an almost identical chip with only minor changes to control registers. The SFGs were followed by the Yamaha FB-01, a standalone version powered exclusively by the YM2164.

Technical details
The YM2151 was paired with either a YM3012 stereo DAC or a YM3014 monophonic DAC so that the output of its FM tone generator could be supplied to speakers as analog audio.

See also
Yamaha YM2164
Yamaha YM2612

References

External links
 Yamaha YM2151 OPM Application Manual

YM2151
Video game music technology